Upaban Express is an intercity train running from Dhaka to Sylhet under Bangladesh Railway. Upaban Express was inaugurated on 4 May 1988. Three other intercity trains, Parabat Express, Jayantika Express and Kalni Express run on this route.

Schedule 
(Bangladesh Railway's schedule is variable. Please visit the official website of Bangladesh Railway to verify the latest schedule. The following schedule is in accordance with the 52nd schedule of Bangladesh Railway, which is effective from 10 January 2020.)

Stopover 
(In some cases, the journey of a train may be changed by Bangladesh Railway. The following list is valid till 2020.)

 Dhaka Airport Railway Station
 Bhairab Bazar Junction
azampur Railway station
 Shaistaganj
 Srimangal
 Vanugas
 Shamsernagar
 Kulaura Junction
 Baramchal
 Maizgaon

Accident 
On 24 June 2019, on its way to Dhaka from Sylhet, Upaban Express had an accident at Baramchal, Moulvibazar, in which at least 4 people were killed and many got injured. In this incident, the railway communication between Sylhet and Dhaka was cut off for about 24 hours.

References 

Passenger rail transport in Bangladesh